James Henry Bannister (1 February 1929 – April 2007), was an English footballer who played as a full back in the Football League.

References

External links

1929 births
2007 deaths
English footballers
Footballers from Chesterfield
Association football defenders
Chesterfield F.C. players
Shrewsbury Town F.C. players
Aldershot F.C. players
Northampton Town F.C. players
Ebbsfleet United F.C. players
English Football League players